Jerome Richardson (1920–2000) was an American jazz musician.

Jerome Richardson may also refer to:

Jerome "Pooh" Richardson (born 1966), American basketball player
Jerry Richardson (1936–2023), American businessman, football player and owner

See also
Jerry Richardson (disambiguation)